Oktyabr is a rural locality (a village) in Nizhnekiginsky Selsoviet, Kiginsky District, Bashkortostan, Russia. The population was 40 as of 2010. There is 1 street.

Geography 
Oktyabr is located 28 km north of Verkhniye Kigi (the district's administrative centre) by road. Igenchelyar is the nearest rural locality.

References 

Rural localities in Kiginsky District